Yohann Ndoye-Brouard (born 29 November 2000) is a French swimmer. He competed in the men's 100 metre backstroke event at the 2020 European Aquatics Championships, in Budapest, Hungary, winning the bronze medal.

References

External links
 

2000 births
Living people
French male backstroke swimmers
European Aquatics Championships medalists in swimming
Swimmers at the 2020 Summer Olympics
Olympic swimmers of France
Sportspeople from Chambéry
Medalists at the 2019 Summer Universiade
Universiade silver medalists for France
Universiade medalists in swimming
21st-century French people